Laos participated in the 2nd Asian Beach Games in Muscat, Oman on 8–16 December 2010.

Medal tally

Medal table

References 

Laos at the Southeast Asian Games
Nations at the 2011 Southeast Asian Games
2010 in Laotian sport